Delaney Collins (born May 2, 1977) is a Canadian retired ice hockey player and coach. She announced her retirement from international play on August 23, 2011.

Playing career
Collins was a member of the Calgary Oval X-Treme in 2007 and 2008, as the team won the WWHL crown in both years.

University
In 1998, she played with the Concordia Stingers of the CIAU. The Stingers won the 1998 CIAU championship and Collins was named to the CIAU All-Canadian team. Collins played with the University of Alberta Pandas women's ice hockey program from 2003 to 2005. She won the CIS National Championship with the Pandas in 2004. Collins assisted on the game-winning goal scored by Danielle Bourgeois in the 2004 CIS National Championship game.

Esso Nationals
She participated in numerous Esso Women's Nationals. Her first experience was in 1999 when she played with Team British Columbia (the team was from New Westminster). The following year, she would play with Team Alberta and win a bronze medal.  In 2001, 2003 and 2007, Collins was part of the gold medal winning Team Alberta roster.

Floorball
In 2010, Collins played for Team Canada's Women's National Floorball Team in the World Floorball Championship Qualification series against Team USA in Vancouver, British Columbia. She became the first player to suit up for Team Canada in both ice hockey and floorball.

Coaching career
On August 23, 2011, Collins was hired as an assistant coach for the 2011–12 Mercyhurst Lakers women's ice hockey season. From 2011-16, Collins served on the coaching staff of the Mercyhurst Lakers where they attended he Frozen Four in 2012-13 and 2013-14. Collins was named an assistant coach of Canada's National Women's Under-18 Team for the 2014–15 and 2016-17 season and Head Coach for the 2017-2018 season. Collins was an Assistant Coach for Canada's National Women's Development Team in 2013-14 and 2015–16, which won gold at the 2016 Nations Cup in Fussen, Germany beating the Finnish National Team in overtime

Awards and honours
1998 CIAU All-Canadian team
Canada West First Team All-Star (2004, 2005)
CIS First All-Canadian Team (2004, 2005)
2005 CIS National Championship All-Star Team
MEDIA ALL-STAR TEAM – 2007 World Women's Championship
 2007 Manitoba Female Athlete of the Year

References

1977 births
Alberta Pandas women's ice hockey players
Athol Murray College of Notre Dame alumni
Canadian women's ice hockey defencemen
Concordia Stingers women's ice hockey players
Ice hockey people from Manitoba
Living people
People from Pilot Mound, Manitoba
Calgary Oval X-Treme players